is a railway station located in the township of Iizaka in the city of Fukushima, Fukushima Prefecture, Japan operated by Fukushima Kōtsū.

Lines

Station layout

Iizaka Onsen Station has two bay platforms serving a single bi-directional track. The station is staffed. Passengers generally disembark trains on the left-side platform and board from the right-side platform (left and right described when facing south (the direction of Fukushima Station)); however, during winter the left-side platform is used for both disembarking and boarding. The ground-level floor of the building contains a FamilyMart convenience store, a small vegetable shop, and a Fukushima Shinkin Bank ATM. The basement level contains the ticket gate and platforms, the station office, the waiting room, and toilets. Tickets are purchased via automated ticket machines, however tickets are checked manually by a station employee when a train's arrival/departure time is near. Generally, passengers are only allowed on the platforms when a train is present.

Adjacent stations

History
The station commenced operations on March 23, 1927.  From 1908 to 1967, Fukushima Kōtsū Iizaka East Line's  was a five-minute walk away, but it was shut down when the Iizaka East line closed. Iizaka Onsen Station's building was renovated in 2010, and the new look was revealed on December 20, 2010.

Surrounding area
The station is located next to the Surikami River.
Iizaka Onsen
Iizaka Post Office

See also
 List of railway stations in Japan

External links
 
  

Railway stations in Japan opened in 1927
Railway stations in Fukushima Prefecture
Fukushima Kōtsū Iizaka Line
Fukushima (city)